"Gold" is a song by British singer Neon Hitch. Featuring American rapper Tyga, it was released on 14 August 2012 as the second single from her unreleased debut album Beg, Borrow & Steal. The song reached number one on the Billboard Hot Dance Club Play chart.

Background and composition
"Gold" was written by Hitch with help from fellow songwriter Claude Kelly as well as producer Benny Blanco and the production team, "The Smeezingtons", the latter two produced the track. "Gold" draws from dance-pop and synthpop genres. In the chorus, the synths fade away as Hitch sings "There's no light in this room / it's alright we got you / you shine like Gold". As the chorus ends, a heavy synth begins and Neon Hitch uses her sing-talk style to continue through the verse. Neon Hitch's style in the chorus was compared to pop singer Britney Spears.

Critical reception
Pop Crush called the single "pure pop bliss", complimenting the catchy lyrics of the song and a better single choice than its predecessor, "Fuck U Betta", because of the more appropriate subject matter.

Music video
Neon uploaded a lyric video on her YouTube account on 16 August 2012. Her manager has confirmed that they plan on shooting the video sometime in September so that it wouldn't conflict with Tyga's schedule. As of 30 December 2012 neither Neon or Tyga have released the video or scheduled a release date for it.

Live performances

Neon Hitch has performed the song at the Highline Ballroom in New York. Hitch has also performed the song on the American talk show Late Night with Jimmy Fallon.

Track listing

Charts

Release history

See also
 List of number-one dance singles of 2013 (U.S.)

References

2012 singles
Tyga songs
Song recordings produced by Benny Blanco
Songs written by Claude Kelly
Songs written by Bruno Mars
2011 songs
Songs written by Philip Lawrence (songwriter)
Song recordings produced by the Smeezingtons
Reprise Records singles
Songs written by Neon Hitch
Songs written by Benny Blanco